Raggejavreraige or Råggejávrrerájgge is a cave located in a mountain above the Hellemofjorden in the municipality of Hamarøy in Nordland county, Norway. Råggejávrrerájgge is a limestone cave that has been eroded by this underground river.

Regional Setting
Raggejavreraige is located on the south side of the fjord within the westernmost stripe. In places, the cave occupies the entire width of the marble, which does not exceed .

Road access to the cave is limited. From Drag, there is scheduled boat service that can be taken to the small village of Musken. Accommodations at the local school and arrangements for trailhead drop-off and pickup by motor-boat can be arranged from Musken. After a stiff hike on a good trail up to an elevation of  the upper entrance area is reached.

Cave Description
This entrance is not particularly distinctive, but its strong, inward gust of wind erases any doubt that it is a large cave.

RJR's dominant feature is the  Storstupet ("Big Shaft"). All of the water falls down a parallel shaft only a few metres away. The Ulvgangen ("Wolf Walk") traverses across the cascades at the mouth of this wet shaft to the dry Storstupet. A pulldown descent of Storstupet is complicated by its low angle (about 80 degrees), and many teams prefer to detackle this pitch from above. Halfway down Storstupet is a window connecting back with the wet shaft, so descending cavers can enjoy all of the sound and fury of the wet shaft in relative comfort. All of the water from the parallel shaft sinks into the floor at its bottom, and is not seen again in the cave.

Unlike Storstupet, Litlestupet is dry, quiet, and free-hanging.

Exploration
Norwegian geologist Steinar Foslie visited the RJR area in the late 1930s, and noted the presence of sinking streams resurging at sea level. In 1968, British caver David Heap of the Kendal Cave Club and Ulv Holbye (after whom Ulvgangen is named) led a school party to about  partway down Storstupet, which was descended the next year by a KCC party using a winch, completing exploration of most of the cave and exiting via the middle entrance. The connection between the two lower entrances was made by a British team in 1979.

The cave is known to resurge below sea level.

References

External links
Caving at Råggejávrrerájgge

Hamarøy
Caves of Norway
Wild caves
Landforms of Nordland